Albinson is an English surname. Notable people with the surname include:

 Dewey Albinson (1898–1971), American artist
 Don Albinson (1921–2008), American industrial designer
 George Albinson (1897–1975), English footballer

See also 
 Albin (disambiguation)

English-language surnames